X Army Corps (X. Armeekorps) was a corps in the German Army during World War II. It was formed in mid-May 1935 from the Cavalry Division.

After the mobilization of 28 August 1939, the corps was deployed under General Wilhelm Ulex on the right wing of the 8th Army (commanded by General Blaskowitz) during the Polish campaign. After taking part in the Battle of the Bzura the corps was transferred to Warsaw. It later moved to western Europe and was eventually stationed in Normandy.

In April 1941 the corps was transferred to East Prussia to take part in Operation Barbarossa as part of the 16th Army in Army Group North. The invasion of Russia commenced on 22 June following.

In 1942 the corps was trapped in the Demyansk Pocket near Leningrad, surrounded by Soviet troops and cut off for several months from the rest of the army. They were supplied by air until German troops could break through to them.

After the lifting of the siege of Leningrad by Generals Govorov and Merezkow and the loss of Novgorod to the Soviet 59th Army in January 1944, the 16th Army was forced to retreat. Having retreated to Riga the corps came under the command of the 18th Army.

After the breakthrough of the Soviet 51st Army under General Kreiser on 10 October near Polangen on the Baltic Sea, X Corps, with the 11th, 30th, and 61st Infantry Divisions, took command of the southern front of the Courland Pocket. From October 27 to November 2, 1944, they withstood the main attack of the Soviet 5th Tank Army and sustained losses of more than 4,000 men. The German Army surrendered on May 8, 1945.

Commanders
 Cavalry General (General der Kavallerie) Wilhelm Knochenhauer, May 1935 – June 1939
 Lieutenant-General Generalleutnant Erich Lüdke, 29. June – 26. August 1939
 Infantry General (General der Infanterie) Wilhelm Ulex, 26. August – October 1939
 Artillery General (General der Artillerie) Christian Hansen, 15. October 1939 – May 1942
 Tank general (General der Panzertruppe) Otto von Knobelsdorff, May – June 1942
 Artillery General (General der Artillerie) Christian Hansen, Juni 1942 bis 1. Juli 1943
 Lieutenant-General Generalleutnant Otto Sponheimer, 1. Juli – 31. July 1943 m.st.F.b.
 Artillery General (General der Artillerie) Christian Hansen, 1 August – 4 November 1943
 Infantry General (General der Infanterie) Thomas-Emil von Wickede, 4 November 1943 – 23 June 1944
 Infantry General (General der Infanterie) Friedrich Köchling, 25 June – 3 September 1944
 Infantry General (General der Infanterie) Hermann Foertsch, 21 September – 21 December 1944
 Lieutenant-General Generalleutnant Johannes Mayer, 21 – 27 December 1944
 Artillery General (General der Artillerie) Siegfried Thomaschki, 27 Dezember 1944 – May 1945

Areas of Operation
    Poland : September 1939 – May 1940
    France : May 1940 – June 1941
    Eastern Front, North Sector : June 1941 – October 1944
    Courland Pocket : October 1944 – May 1945

References

 Based on a translation of the equivalent article ( :de:X. Armeekorps (Wehrmacht)) on German Wikipedia
 Georg Tessin: Verbände und Truppen der deutschen Wehrmacht und Waffen-SS im Zweiten Weltkrieg 1939–1945, Volume 3, Frankfurt/Main und Osnabrück 1966, pp 163–164.
 Percy Ernst Schramm (Hrsg.): Kriegstagebuch des Oberkommandos der Wehrmacht, Bernard & Graefe Verlag for Wehrwesen, Frankfurt am Main 1965.
 Volume I: 1940/41 written by Hans-Adolf Jacobsen.
 Volume II: 1942 written by Andreas Hillgruber, Bernard & Graefe Verlag for Wehrwesen, Frankfurt am Main 1965.
 Volume III: 1943 written by Walther Hubatsch, Bernard & Graefe Verlag for Wehrwesen, Frankfurt am Main 1965.

Army,10
Military units and formations established in 1935
1935 establishments in Germany
Military units and formations disestablished in 1945